Alfred Roscher (born 11 November 1959) is an Austrian retired footballer.

References

External links
 Alfred Roscher at Austria Archiv 
 Alfred Roscher at austriasoccer.at 

1959 births
Living people
Austrian footballers
Austria international footballers
Association football forwards
Austrian Football Bundesliga players
Bundesliga players
FK Austria Wien players
First Vienna FC players
Wiener Sport-Club players
FC Wacker Innsbruck players
SV Waldhof Mannheim players
SK Vorwärts Steyr players
FC Kärnten players
FC Swarovski Tirol players
Austrian expatriate sportspeople in West Germany
Expatriate footballers in West Germany
Austrian expatriate footballers